Ectoedemia fuscivittata is a moth of the family Nepticulidae. It is only known from rainforests in Belize and Ecuador.

The wingspan is 4.1-4.3 mm for males. Adults are on wing in April in Belize and in January in Ecuador.

External links
A review and checklist of the Neotropical Nepticulidae (Lepidoptera)

Nepticulidae
Moths of Central America
Moths described in 2000